Salim Abes (born 17 October 1970) is an Algerian handball player. He competed in the 1996 Summer Olympics.

References

1970 births
Living people
Handball players at the 1996 Summer Olympics
Algerian male handball players
Olympic handball players of Algeria
21st-century Algerian people